The Crestones are a group of four 14,000 foot (4,268 m) peaks (fourteeners) in the Sangre de Cristo Range above Crestone, central southern Colorado, comprising:
Crestone Peak (14,294 ft, 4,357 m)
Crestone Needle (14,197 ft, 4,327 m)
Kit Carson Mountain (14,165 ft, 4,317 m)
Humboldt Peak (14,064 ft, 4,287 m)

Snow is usually mostly melted by early July. Climbers can expect afternoon rain, hail, and lightning from the seasonal monsoon in late July and August.

Climbing
Crestone Peak and Crestone Needle are rock scrambles (Class 3) with some exposure. 
Kit Carson Mountain is a walk-up (Class 2), but only if the correct route is carefully followed; it has claimed more lives than Crestone Peak or Crestone Needle. Challenger Point (14,081 ft, 4,292 m) and Columbia Point are sub-peaks of Kit Carson Mountain. 
Humboldt Peak is the easiest of the four, with a straightforward walk-up route. Sometimes Humboldt is not included in the term "The Crestones."

Broken Hand Peak, southeast of Crestone Needle, is included within the official name "Crestone Peaks".  Mount Adams (13,931 ft, 4246 m) is a notable peak just to the north of the Crestones, and is quite rugged.

Note that Crestone Peak and Crestone Needle are somewhat more technical climbs than many Colorado fourteeners; caution is advised. About one person per year is killed on the Crestones; occasionally they are skilled mountaineers.

See also

Rocky Mountains
Southern Rocky Mountains
Sangre de Cristo Mountains
Sangre de Cristo Range
Geography of Colorado
Mountain ranges of Colorado
Mountain peaks of Colorado
Mountain passes of Colorado
Outline of Colorado
Index of Colorado-related articles

References

External links
The Crestones on TopoQuest

Well illustrated trip report of climbs of Crestone Needle and Crestone Peak via Broken Hand Pass

Fourteeners of Colorado
Mountains of Colorado
Sangre de Cristo Mountains
Mountains of Custer County, Colorado
Mountains of Saguache County, Colorado